Piquadro is an Italian leather goods company specializing in business and travel items in Italy and internationally. The company offers products ranging from men's and women's professional bags to luggage and small leather items. As of April 2010, it distributed its products through approximately 1500 points of sale. Piquadro has received a number of patents in recognition of its technical and functional innovations.

Corporate history
The company was founded in 1987 by Marco Palmieri, 

In 1998, the Piquadro brand was launched its name meaning P squared with the P standing for both, Palmieri (the founder) and pelletterie (leather goods). The first Piquadro single branded store was opened in Milan via della Spiga in 2000 and it was followed by Rome via Frattina two year later.

In 2004, the company began an internationalization campaign including investments and the opening of new stores abroad in Moscow and Barcelona. In the following years, more shops were inaugurated in Salzburg, Frankfurt, Hong Kong, until the most recent openings in the United Arab Emirates, Shanghai, Beijing, and Taipei.

In 2006, the new headquarters were inaugurated in Gaggio Montano, on the road that takes from Bologna to Pistoia in Tuscany.

In October 2007, Piquadro was listed on the Italian stock exchange (Borsa Italiana).
In 2010, the company sells through an International distribution network which includes 82 Piquadro single branded shops, of which 48 are located in Italy.

The consolidated turnover of the Group at March 2010 was 52,2 million euros with a 1% increase compared to the previous year and a 22,1% average increase in the 6 previous years.

Ownership structure
 Marco Palmieri — 67%
 Fil Limited — 6.9%
 Mediobanca — 6.3%
 Mercato — 19.7%
Source: Consob, April 14, 2010

See also 

Armani
Attolini
Luciano Barbera
Belvest
Blufin
Boglioli
Borrelli
Borsalino
Bottega Veneta
Braccialini
Brioni
Luciano Brunelli
Buccellati
Bulgari
Canali
Caraceni
Roberto Cavalli
Corneliani
Costume National
Brunello Cucinelli
Damiani
Dolce & Gabbana
Drago
Etro
Extè
Fendi
Ferragamo
Fiorucci
Sorelle Fontana
Frette
Furla
Genny
GIADA
Gucci
Gianfranco Ferré
Iceberg
Isaia
La Perla
Lardini
Larusmiani
André Laug
Loro Piana
Kiton
Krizia
Malo
E. Marinella
Marni
Max Mara
Missoni
Moschino
Piana Clerico
Pinko
Pomellato
Prada
Reda
Stefano Ricci
Marina Rinaldi
Rubinacci
Sermoneta Gloves
Ermanno Scervino
Tod's
Trussardi
Valentino
Valextra
Versace
Vitale Barberis Canonico
Zegna
Pal Zileri
Made in Italy

References

External links
Piquadro Official website
Yahoo stock profile
FT stock profile
Piquadro's year net profit rises, shares up

Leather manufacturers
Design companies of Italy
Companies based in the Metropolitan City of Bologna
Italian companies established in 1987
Manufacturing companies established in 1987
Design companies established in 1987
High fashion brands
Luggage manufacturers
Luggage brands
Fashion accessory brands
Bags (fashion)